Moffett Federal Airfield , also known as Moffett Field, is a joint civil-military airport located in an unincorporated part of Santa Clara County, California, United States, between northern Mountain View and northern Sunnyvale. On November 10, 2014, NASA announced that it would be leasing  of the airfield property to Google for 60 years.

The airport is near the south end of San Francisco Bay, northwest of San Jose. Formerly a US Navy facility, the former naval air station is now owned and operated by the NASA Ames Research Center. Tenant military activities include the 129th Rescue Wing of the California Air National Guard, operating the HC-130J Combat King II and HH-60G Pave Hawk aircraft, as well as the adjacent Headquarters for the 7th Psychological Operations Group of the US Army Reserve. Until 28 July 2010, the US Air Force's 21st Space Operations Squadron was also a tenant command at Moffett Field, occupying the former Onizuka Air Force Station. In addition to these military activities, NASA also operates several of its own aircraft from Moffett.

Hangars One, Two, and Three, and the adjacent Shenandoah Plaza are collectively designated as a National Historic District listed on the National Register of Historic Places.

Hangar One is one of the world's largest freestanding structures, covering . The hangar was constructed in 1931. Hangar One is a Naval Historical Monument, Historic American Engineering Record CA-335, State of California Historic Civil Engineering Landmarks. In May 2008, The National Trust for Historic Preservation listed Hangar One on their list of America's Most Endangered Places.

Hangar Two and Hangar Three are some of the world's largest freestanding wood structures. The hangars were constructed when the US Navy established ten lighter-than-air bases across the United States during World War II as part of the coastal defense plan. Seven of the original seventeen of these wooden hangars still exist: two at Moffett Field, two at Tustin, California, one at Tillamook, Oregon, and two at Lakehurst, New Jersey.

The adjacent NASA Ames Research Center is also home to several wind tunnels, including the Unitary Plan Wind Tunnel (a National Historic Landmark), and the National Full-Scale Aerodynamic Complex.

History

Sunnyvale operations
In 1930, the city of Sunnyvale acquired a  parcel of farmland bordering San Francisco Bay, paid for with nearly  raised by the citizens of Santa Clara County, then "sold" the parcel for $1 to the US government as a home base for the Navy airship USS Macon. The location proved to be ideal for an airport, since the area is often clear while other parts of the San Francisco Bay are covered in fog. This is due to the Coast Range to the west, which blocks the cold oceanic air that is the cause of San Francisco fog.

Naval operations
The naval air station (NAS) was authorized by an Act of Congress, signed by President Herbert Hoover on 12 February 1931. Construction of the original facilities was begun 8 July 1931. The base was originally named Airbase Sunnyvale CAL as it was thought that calling it Mountain View would cause officials to fear airships colliding with mountainsides. The original station was commissioned on 12 April 1933 and dedicated NAS Sunnyvale. After the death of Rear Admiral William A. Moffett, who is credited with the creation of the airfield, in the loss of the USS Akron on 4 April 1933, the airfield at NAS Sunnyvale was renamed NAS Moffett Field on 1 September 1933.

After the Macon crashed in the Pacific Ocean on 12 February 1935, the Navy considered closing Moffett Field due to its high cost of operations. Also, in San Diego, the Army and Navy were having jurisdictional issues over Naval Air Station North Island in San Diego harbor, which had both NAS San Diego as well as the Army's Rockwell Field dividing the island. The Navy wanted the Army out of North Island as it needed to expand NAS San Diego as a training airfield for its growing number of aircraft carrier pilots. The Army resisted strongly, as Rockwell Field was a major training airfield for flight cadets, and had been using the field for flight training since 1912. With the subtle assistance of President Franklin Roosevelt, a former assistant secretary of the Navy, a complex arrangement of facilities realignment was made by the War Department which transferred Moffett to Army jurisdiction and Rockwell Field to the Navy in October 1935, becoming NAS North Island.

Upon taking jurisdiction of Moffett Field, the Army took on the high cost of Hangar One's maintenance and wanted to inactivate the facility. However, President Roosevelt would not allow the closure of the facility, and the Army assigned Moffett to its Western Flying Training Command as headquarters for pilot and aircrew flight training west of the Rocky Mountains. Also in 1939, Moffett saw the establishment of the Ames Aeronautical Laboratory.

As an aftermath of the Japanese attack on Pearl Harbor, the Navy wanted to use the airship hangars at Moffett for blimp operations along with Pacific Coast. However, the Army, still stinging about having to transfer Rockwell Field to the Navy, resisted strongly. Again the inter-service rivalry was overruled by the War Department, citing the Navy's need for coastal defense a priority and ordered the Army to move its training headquarters to Hamilton Field in Marin County, north of San Francisco.

On April 16, 1942, control of the facility was returned to the Navy and it was recommissioned as NAS Sunnyvale. Four days later it was again renamed Naval Air Station Moffett Field. From the end of World War II until its closure, NAS Moffett Field saw the development and use of several generations of land-based anti-submarine warfare and maritime patrol aircraft, including the Lockheed P2V Neptune and Lockheed P-3 Orion. Until the demise of the USSR and for some time thereafter, daily anti-submarine, maritime reconnaissance, Fleet support, and various training sorties flew out from NAS Moffett Field to patrol along the Pacific coastline, while Moffett's other squadrons and aircraft periodically deployed to other Pacific, Indian Ocean and Persian Gulf bases for periods of up to six months.

The onset of the Korean War brought a restructuring of the Navy's disposition of air forces, resulting in several squadrons being transferred to the Moffett Field as well as Naval Air Station Alameda. During the 1950s the Moffett served as the fighter base, with Alameda hosting attack aircraft. Naval aircraft home based in Moffett included the F9F Panther and FJ-3 Fury. On Feb. 1, 1957, a Navy Thunderjet plane piloted by Capt. Robert Mulvehill, 32, of Edenburg, PA, crashed at 3:25 p.m. in Mountain View while on approach to Moffett Field. The plane was travelling parallel to Castro Street when it crashed near the corner of California and Oak Streets, narrowly missing an elementary school, according to the Mountain View Register-Leader—the local paper of record at the time.

By the end of the 1950s the Navy was looking to consolidate assets as the majority of carrier based aircraft had transitioned to larger jet powered aircraft, needing longer runways. The majority of squadrons based at Moffett transferred to Naval Air Station Miramar when they transitioned to the F-8 Crusader; while attack aircraft from Alameda were relocated to the newly opened Naval Air Station Lemoore. By 1961, the last fighter aircraft had left Moffett Field.

In 1960, the nearby Air Force Satellite Test Center (STC), was created adjacent to (on the SE corner of) NAS Moffett Field. Often referred to as "the Blue Cube," it was operational until 2010 as Onizuka Air Force Station, now part of the Air Force Satellite Control Network (AFSCN).

In August 1986 during the NAS Moffett Field Airshow, the Italian demonstration team, Frecce Tricolori, and the German Navy's F-104 flight demonstration team, the Vikings, performed in front of the crowd.

At its peak in the 1990s, NAS Moffett Field was the U.S. Navy's principal Pacific Fleet base for the P-3C operations. In addition to headquarters staffs for Commander, U.S. Patrol Wings Pacific Fleet (COMPATWINGSPAC); Commander, Patrol Wing 10 (COMPATWING 10); and Commander, Reserve Patrol Wing Pacific / Patrol Wing 4 (COMRESPATWINGPAC/COMPATWING 4), the air station also hosted Patrol Squadron THIRTY-ONE (VP-31)...the west coast P-3C Fleet Replacement Squadron, six additional active duty P-3C squadrons and a Naval Air Reserve P-3C squadron in addition to NASA and California Air National Guard aviation activities.

Ames Research Center operations
Post-Cold War defense cutbacks and related Base Realignment and Closure (BRAC) actions in the 1990s identified NAS Moffett Field for closure. The west coast Fleet Replacement Squadron, Patrol Squadron 31 (VP-31), was deactivated and its functions combined with its east coast counterpart, Patrol Squadron 30 (VP-30) at NAS Jacksonville, Florida. Several active duty P-3C squadrons, the Naval Air Reserve P-3C squadron and COMRESPATWINGPAC/COMPATWING 4 were also deactivated, while COMPATWINGSPAC and COMPATWING 10 (redesignated COMPATRECONWING 10) transferred to NAS Whidbey Island, Washington and the remaining patrol squadrons transferred to NAS Whidbey Island, Washington or NAS Barbers Point, Hawaii until the latter's BRAC-directed closure in 1999, at which time the Barbers Point squadrons moved to Marine Corps Air Facility Kaneohe Bay, Hawaii.

On 1 July 1994, NAS Moffett Field was closed as a naval air station and turned over to the NASA Ames Research Center. NASA Ames now operates the facility as Moffett Federal Airfield. Since being decommissioned as a primary military installation, part of Moffett has been made accessible to the public, including a cordoned portion of the interior of the massive Hangar One. There were once balloon rides given on show days. And micro-weather still occurs in the cavernous space.

Moffett Federal Airfield has occasional air traffic, with an average of 5-10 flights landing per day. Moffett is regularly used by the California Air National Guard, NASA, Lockheed Martin Space Systems (commercial satellite manufacturer), the Google founders for their private planes, the Santa Clara County Sheriff's Department for their helicopter STAR 1, and Air Force One during presidential visits to the Bay Area.

In 2008, the Ames Research Center leased 42 acres around the field to Google. In 2013 Google began building a 1.1 million square foot office complex consisting of nine buildings overlooking San Francisco Bay dubbed "Bay View." The buildings are to be the new headquarters for Google and will be part of the nearby Googleplex.

Hangar One 

Moffett Field's "Hangar One" (built during the Depression era for the USS Macon) and the row of World War II blimp hangars are still some of the largest unsupported structures in the country. The airship hangar is constructed on a network of steel girders sheathed with galvanized steel. It rests firmly upon a reinforced pad anchored to concrete pilings. The floor covers eight acres (32,000 m2) and can accommodate six (360 feet x 160 feet) football fields. The building has aerodynamic architecture. The clam-shell doors were designed to reduce turbulence when the Macon moved in and out on windy days. The "orange peel" doors, weighing 500 tons (511.88 tonnes) each, are moved by their own 150 horsepower motors operated via an electrical control panel.

The airship hangar's interior is so large that fog sometimes forms near the ceiling. A person unaccustomed to its vastness is susceptible to optical disorientation. Looking across its deck, planes and tractors look like toys. Along its length maintenance shops, inspection laboratories and offices help keep the hangar busy. Looking up, a network of catwalks for access to all parts of the structure can be seen. Two elevators meet near the top, allowing maintenance personnel to get to the top quickly and easily.

Narrow gauge tracks run through the length of the hangar. During the period of lighter-than-air dirigibles and non-rigid aircraft, the rails extended across the apron and into the fields at each end of the hangar. This tramway facilitated the transportation of an airship on the mooring mast to the airship hangar interior or to the flight position. During the brief period that the Macon was based at Moffett, Hangar One accommodated not only the giant airship but several smaller non-rigid lighter-than-air craft simultaneously.

In 2003 plans to convert Hangar One to a space and science center were put on hold with the discovery that the structure was leaking toxic chemicals into the sediment in wetlands bordering San Francisco Bay. The chemicals originated in the lead paint and toxic materials, including polychlorinated biphenyls (PCBs), used to coat the hangar. Options under debate included tearing down the hangar and reusing the land, and cleaning the toxic waste from the site and refurbishing the hangar for future preservation.

The US Navy evaluated options for remediating the PCBs, lead and asbestos, and NASA evaluated options for reuse of the hangar. Some historic and nonprofit groups wanted the hangar preserved as a historic landmark, as the hangar is a major Bay Area landmark and historic site.

In 2006, an offer to clean the hangar and coat its outsides with solar panels to recoup the costs of cleaning was floated by a private company, but the plan never saw fruition because it was too costly.

In August 2008, the Navy proposed simply stripping the toxic coating from the hangar and leaving the skeleton after spraying it with a preservative. The Navy claimed that to reclad the structure would cost another $15 million and that this was NASA's responsibility. This was regarded as a partial victory by campaigners.

In September 2008, NASA indicated that it was still urging the Navy to restore the hangar, but that it was willing to help save the structure; in particular, NASA was in favor of re-covering the structure at the same time that it was stripped.

 In April 2011, the exterior panels began coming down, starting at the top.

Restoration
On April 21, 2011, crews began stripping the PCB-laced exterior panels of Hangar One.

In November 2014, Planetary Ventures LLC, a Google subsidiary, signed a $1.16 billion, 60-year lease. 
This would "save NASA approximately $6.3 million annually in maintenance and operation costs". Google planned to invest an additional $200 million to renovate and restore the structure.

Hangars 2 & 3
Moffett Field's Hangars Two and Three were built at the beginning of World War II for a program of coastal defense. The Hangars are still some of the largest unsupported wooden structures in the country.

In 1940, the US Navy proposed to the US Congress the development of a lighter-than-air station program for anti-submarine patrolling of the coast and harbors. This program proposed the construction of new stations in addition to the expansion at NAS Lakehurst. The Second Deficiency Appropriation Bill for 1941, passed July 3, 1941, changed the authorization to the construction of 8 facilities to accommodate a total of 48 airships (as requested in 1940), but due to steel rations, a total of 17 large wooden hangars were built among 10 LTA bases.

As finally developed in 1943, LTA facilities in addition to NAS Lakehurst (2) and NAS Moffett Field (2), included NAS South Weymouth (1), NAS Weeksville (1), NAS Glynco (2), NAS Richmond (3), NAS Houma (1), NAS Hitchcock (1), NAS Santa Ana (2) and NAS Tillamook (2). In the initial program, accommodations were provided for six airships at each station. This was later increased to twelve at seven of the stations and to eighteen at NAS Richmond as a result of an increase in the authorized strength to 200 airships.

Seven of the original 17 of the wooden hangars still exist: Moffett Field (2), Tustin, California (2), Tillamook, Oregon (1), and Lakehurst, New Jersey (2).

An episode of the Discovery Channel TV show MythBusters used one of the hangars to disprove the myth that it is not possible to fold a sheet of paper in half more than seven times. The sheet of paper covered nearly the full width of the airship hangar. OtherMythbusters episodes have utilized the hangar to test myths such as "Inflating a football with helium allows longer kick distances" and "Airworthy aircraft can be constructed of concrete."

Facilities
Despite its closure as an active military base, Moffett Field still has many active facilities and residents. Active military families still live on Moffett Community Housing, and the former base has several lodges which primarily house academics and students associated with the Ames Research Center. Moffett Field's facilities available to residents include a Commissary, post office, golf course, and tennis courts.

Status of former military buildings
Many of the buildings at Moffett Field which once supported its active military presence have been abandoned and left standing due to asbestos contamination within the structures .

Airfield
Moffett Field is an active airfield, and has two active runways:

Runway 14L/32R: , surface: concrete
Runway 14R/32L: , surface: asphalt

University facilities

Moffett Field also hosts three university branch campuses--San Jose State University's (SJSU) Metropolitan Technology Center, Carnegie Mellon Silicon Valley, UC Santa Cruz, and Singularity University. These are within the base primarily to support the academic and research collaboration between these institutions and NASA Ames.

Private aircraft
Moffett Airfield is home to H211, LLC, owned by Google founders Larry Page and Sergey Brin. Through the LLC they pay $1.3 million a year to NASA to park their Boeing 767-200 and Gulfstream V jets. The airplanes have also had scientific equipment installed by NASA to allow experiments to be run in flight.

Lockheed Martin and Jon Stark, a helicopter operator, also have use of the airfield.

In October 2008 the first Zeppelin airship to offer private flights in the United States since 1937's Hindenburg disaster became available for tours of the Bay Area and beyond. The  craft, operated by Airship Ventures, was housed in Hangar Two, was built in Germany and was the fourth modern airship constructed and the third to be put in public service. It was dedicated and given the name Eureka at the celebration of Moffett Field's 75th anniversary. Zeppelin flights ended in November 2012, and Airship Ventures ceased business. Eureka was disassembled and returned to Germany.

Strong community opposition to the use of the airfield by FedEx Express and UPS Airlines blocked the transition of the airfield to public use in the 1990s.

United States Geological Survey (USGS)
In 2016, the United States Geological Survey (USGS) announced plans to relocate its West Coast science center from nearby Menlo Park to the Ames Research Center at Moffett Field. The relocation is expected to take five years and will begin in 2017 with 175 of the USGS employees moving to Moffett.

Motor racing
On August 16, 1953, the airfield was used for a meeting organised by the Sports Car Club of America. A 5.6 km circuit was created using one of the main runways and adjacent taxiways.

Assigned units
129th Rescue Wing, California Air National Guard
63rd Regional Readiness Command Headquarters, United States Army Reserve
7th Psychological Operations Group Headquarters, United States Army Reserve
341st Military Police Company (Combat Support), U.S. Army Reserve
341st MP CO, U.S. Army Reserve
351st Civil Affairs Command, U.S. Army Reserve
Marine Corps Recruiting Station San Francisco, Marine Corps Recruiting Command

Accidents and incidents at or near NUQ
On April 11, 1968, a Royal Australian Air Force Lockheed P-3C Orion burst into flames when the undercarriage collapsed on landing during pre-delivery acceptance trials. There were no fatalities.
On May 26, 1972, a United States Navy Lockheed P-3C Orion went missing during a routine training flight off the coast of California. All eight crew were presumed dead.
On April 12, 1973, a NASA Convair CV-990 Coronado (Reg.#N711NA) on a nearby training flight and a US Navy Lockheed P-3C Orion (Reg.#157332) also on a nearby training flight collided on final approach 1 km (0.6 miles) S of Moffett Field NAS and both aircraft crashed onto Sunnyvale Municipal Golf Course, half a mile short of the runway. All 11 occupants on the Convair 990 Coronado and five of the six crew on board the Lockheed P-3C were killed in the accident. A total of 16 perished on both aircraft with one survivor.

See also

Airship hangar
Bayshore-NASA (VTA) light rail station
California during World War II
California World War II Army Airfields
List of military squadrons and aircraft based at Moffett Field
Watsonville Airport Moffett Field, auxiliary field in World War II

References 
Notes

Bibliography
  (Public domain)

External links 

 Moffett Field page at GlobalSecurity.org
 NASA Ames Research Center
 129th Rescue Wing
 Moffett Field Historical Society Museum
 Aviation: From Sand Dunes to Sonic Booms, a National Park Service Discover Our Shared Heritage Travel Itinerary
 
 Moffett Field Wine Festival
 https://sites.google.com/a/pv-nuq.com/nuq/

NASA facilities
Historic districts in California
History of Silicon Valley

Moffett Field
Transportation in Sunnyvale, California
Military facilities on the National Register of Historic Places in California
National Register of Historic Places in Santa Clara County, California
Airports in Santa Clara County, California
Airfields of the United States Army Air Forces in California
Installations of the United States Air National Guard
Military Superfund sites
Superfund sites in California
Military facilities in the San Francisco Bay Area
Airports established in 1933
1933 establishments in California